Elsayed can refer to:

People

Surname
Dahlia Elsayed (born 1969), American painter and writer
Emadeldin Elsayed (born 1986), Egyptian documentary filmmaker
Essmat Elsayed (born 1986), Egyptian weightlifter
Esraa El-Sayed (born 1998), Egyptian weightlifter
Fady Elsayed (born 1993), British actor
Karim Elsayed (born 1995), Egyptian canoeist
Mohamed Elsayed (born 1973), Egyptian boxer
Mohamed El-Sayed (Qatari footballer) (born 1987), Qatari international footballer
Mohamed the son of Mohamed Elamir awad Elsayed (1968–2001), Egyptian hijacker and one of the ringleaders in the September 11 attacks
Noura Elsayed (born 1987), Egyptian middle-distance runner
Rasha Elsayed (born 1981), Egyptian volleyball player
Shaker Elsayed, Imam of the Dar Al-Hijrah mosque in Falls Church, Virginia

Given Name
Elsayed Aboumedan (born 1977), Egyptian judoka
Elsayed Eldizwi (1926–1991), Egyptian footballer
Elsayed Elsayed Wagih (born 21 November 1946, Egyptian Professor of Virology and Biotechnology and vice President of the Arab Society for Biotechnology
Elsayed Hamdi, Egyptian football striker
Sara Samir Elsayed Mohamed Ahmed (born 1998), Egyptian weightlifter